Stekelenburg is a surname. Notable people with the surname include:

 Lennart Stekelenburg (born 1986), Dutch swimmer
 Maarten Stekelenburg (born 1982), Dutch footballer
 Maarten Stekelenburg (born 1972), Dutch football manager